Bedford County Public Schools is a school district based in Bedford, Virginia, United States. It serves Bedford County, Virginia, United States.

Schools

Elementary schools

Bedford Elementary School 	 
Bedford Primary School
Big Island Elementary School
Body Camp Elementary School (Closed)
Boonsboro Elementary School 
Forest Elementary School
Goodview Elementary School
Huddleston Elementary School	 
Moneta Elementary School
Montvale Elementary School	 
New London Academy
Otter River Elementary School	 
Stewartsville Elementary School	 
Thaxton Elementary School (Closed)
Thomas Jefferson Elementary School

Middle schools
Bedford Middle School (closed)
Forest Middle School
Liberty Middle School  
Staunton River Middle School

High schools

Bedford Science and Technology Center
Jefferson Forest High School 
Liberty High School 
Staunton River High School

Foundation
The Bedford Area Educational Foundation raises funds and provides grants to improve education in Bedford and Bedford County.

References

External links
Bedford County Public Schools

School divisions in Virginia
Education in Bedford County, Virginia